Ekambaresh Lakshmi Narayanan, better known by his stage name Tippu (born 1 November 1978) is an Indian playback singer who has performed over 4000 songs in Telugu, Tamil and Kannada, languages.

Biography
Tippu has sung over 4000 songs in various languages such as Kannada, Tamil, Telugu and Malayalam. He has sung many hit songs in his career. He has lent his voice for the films starring South Indian super stars like Dr. Vishnuvardhan and Rajinikanth. He has sung for many stars in South India, but it is his combination with Kannada super star Puneeth Rajkumar that has struck a chord with the audience. This combination has given many hit songs to the industry. The songs 'Shiva antha hoguthidde' from Jackie, 'Yaavanig gothu' from Paramaathma, 'Hey hey Paaru' from Raaj, 'Hejjegondu hejje' from Prithvi, and 'Ley Ley' from Raam have all been major hits. His combination with the music director V. Harikrishna is very popular. They have delivered hit songs like 'Aakasha ishta aagideyo' from Gaalipata, 'Shiva antha hoguthidde' from Jackie, 'Yaavanig gothu' from Paramaathma, 'Hey hey Paaru' from Raaj, 'Ley Ley' from Raam, 'Junglee Shivalingu' from Junglee, and 'Edeyolage guitar' from Only Vishnuvardhana, most of them written by top lyricist and filmmaker Yogaraj Bhat.

Discography

Telugu discography

Tamil songs

Kannada songs

Hindi songs
{| class="wikitable"
|-
! Film !! Song Name !! Music Director !!Notes
|-
|Indra - The Tiger||Bam bam bole||Mani Sharma||Hindi dubbed version of Telugu film Indra
|-
|}

Awards
In 2010, Tippu won the Karnataka State Film Award for Best Male Playback Singer for the song "Hey Paaru" from the film Raaj the Showman'' composed by the top most composer of the Kannada Film Industry V. Harikrishna. Tippu was awarded the Kalaimamani by the Government of Tamil Nadu in 2007.

References

External links

Tippu's discography

Tamil singers
Telugu playback singers
Malayalam playback singers
Living people
Indian male playback singers
Musicians from Tiruchirappalli
Kannada playback singers
Tamil playback singers
1978 births